The Journal of Banking and Finance is a peer-reviewed academic journal covering research on financial institutions, capital markets, and topics in investments and corporate finance. In 1989 the journal absorbed Studies in Banking & Finance. A 2011 study ranked it among six elite finance journals. It publishes theoretical and empirical research papers spanning all the major research fields in finance and banking. Geert Bekaert is currently the managing editor.

See also 
 Journal of Money, Credit and Banking

References

External links 
 

Elsevier academic journals
English-language journals
Finance journals
Publications established in 1977
Monthly journals